Dan Trachtenberg (born May 11, 1981) is an American filmmaker and podcast host. He is best known for directing the films 10 Cloverfield Lane (2016) and Prey (2022), the former earning him a Directors Guild of America Award nomination for Outstanding Directing – First-Time Feature Film. In 2019, he directed the pilot episode of the Amazon Prime Video series The Boys, and in 2021 directed the pilot episode of the Peacock series The Lost Symbol, on which he also served as an executive producer.  

Trachtenberg was one of three hosts of The Totally Rad Show podcast and was a former co-host of the Geekdrome podcast. He also directed episodes for the Ctrl+Alt+Chicken podcast. All three programs were hosted at Revision3. He also directed the 2011 short film Portal: No Escape, an episode of Black Mirror entitled "Playtest" and the director of various television commercials and public service announcements. He is currently developing a TV series adaptation of the 1995 film Waterworld.

Directing
 
Trachtenberg has directed commercials for Lexus, Nike, and Coca-Cola. In 2003, he directed the short film Kickin. In April 2008, he joined Tight Films, for which he collaborated with Matt Wolf on an alternate reality game for Hellboy II: The Golden Army.

He directed the internet show, Ctrl+Alt+Chicken.

In March 2011, Trachtenberg released a short film for BlackBoxTV titled More Than You Can Chew, starring J. Kristopher, Skye Marshall and Ian Hamrick. Trachtenberg co-wrote the story with Mark D. Walker.

On August 23, 2011, Trachtenberg released the short film Portal: No Escape, based on the video game Portal, which has since garnered more than twenty-seven million views on YouTube.

On October 13, 2011, /Film announced that Trachtenberg would be directing a science fiction action heist film for Universal Pictures with writer Chris Morgan.

In January 2013, iFanboy broke the news that Trachtenberg would direct the film adaptation of Y: The Last Man. However, on September 25, 2014, /Film announced that the film had been cancelled.

On April 3, 2014, Ain't It Cool News announced that Trachtenberg would direct a film for Bad Robot Productions titled Valencia, which was later revealed to be a code name for 10 Cloverfield Lane. On January 15, 2016, the trailer for 10 Cloverfield Lane was released. Producer J. J. Abrams said about the film, "The idea came up a long time ago during production. We wanted to make it a blood relative of Cloverfield. The idea was developed over time. We wanted to hold back the title for as long as possible."

On April 30, 2018, it was announced that Dan Trachtenberg would direct the first episode of the Amazon series The Boys, replacing Seth Rogen and Evan Goldberg, who dropped out due to scheduling conflicts.

On January 14, 2019, Trachtenberg was announced to be directing a live action film adaptation of the video game series Uncharted. However on August 22, 2019, it was announced he had exited the film.

On November 20, 2020, it was announced that Trachtenberg had been engaged by 20th Century Studios to direct the fifth installment in the Predator film series, titled Prey.

Personal life
Trachtenberg married Priscilla Hernandez in 2011.

Filmography
Short films
Portal: No Escape (2011)
More Than You Can Chew (2012)
Warframe (2019)

Feature films

Television

References

External links
 
 

1981 births
Living people
Artists from Philadelphia
American Internet celebrities
American film directors
Jewish American screenwriters
Revision3
Screenwriters from Pennsylvania
21st-century American Jews